Highmark Stadium may refer to:

 Highmark Stadium (New York), home stadium of the Buffalo Bills of the National Football League
 Highmark Stadium (Pennsylvania), home stadium of Pittsburgh Riverhounds SC of the USL Championship